Peter Kolni (born 27 June 1948) is a Swedish sailor. He competed at the 1968 Summer Olympics, the 1972 Summer Olympics, and the 1976 Summer Olympics.

References

External links
 

1948 births
Living people
Swedish male sailors (sport)
Olympic sailors of Sweden
Sailors at the 1968 Summer Olympics – Flying Dutchman
Sailors at the 1972 Summer Olympics – Flying Dutchman
Sailors at the 1976 Summer Olympics – Tornado
Sportspeople from Gothenburg